Purity (ṭahāra(h)) is an essential aspect of Islam. It is the opposite of najāsa, the state of being ritually impure. It is achieved by first removing physical impurities (for example, urine) from the body, and then removing ritual impurity by means of wudu (usually) or ghusl.

In the Quran
The Quran says:  and also there is one verse which concerned with Taharah or purity and impurity of Humans:

Importance in Islam 
Observing cleanliness of the soul, the clothes, and the surroundings is obligatory upon every Muslim, and this is considered one of the pillars of Islam.

Before offering prayers, it is necessary to perform wudu, and in certain cases, ghusl. The purifying agent is always clean water. However, during times when water is not available or is scarce, symbolic wudu and ghusl can be performed with clean dry earth which is known as Tayammum.

If the body or clothes show traces of urine, feces, semen or alcohol, then taharah becomes essential. Many juridical opinions add blood and pus to that list. The clothes should be washed and the affected part of the body cleaned with pure water, or the whole body given a ghusl as the case may be.

Most Muslims believe that they must perform a ritual cleansing with water (Wudu) before touching a copy of the Quran, although this view is not universal.

When in a state of major ritual impurity, one should not even recite the Quran, let alone touch it. 

In a state of minor ritual impurity, it is forbidden (in some schools, makruh) to handle the Quran and to read it, and is considered to be acceptable (neutral, mubah) to recite it, although it is better liked (recommended, mustahabb) to be ritually pure. 

A mushaf is only a Quran if it is the Arabic Quranic text, and a book that contains more than 50% non-Quranic material is not viewed as a Quran for the above purposes, even if it contains verses of the Quran or the entire Quranic text. Examples would be a tafsir, or a translation of the Quran such as Yusuf Ali's (with commentary) which contains over fifteen times as much text in footnotes than it does in Quranic text or Quranic interpretation in either Arabic or English, or a book of hadith that contains Quranic verses embedded in the narrations.

Shia views 
In respect to purity of non-Muslims, some of the Shia Muslims believe in the impurity of non-Muslims. However, there are others which believe in the purity of non-Muslims.

Some people such as Shaykh Tusi believed that it is not permissible to eat with Kuffar or non-Muslims. Considering non-believers as Najis has been prevalent until twentieth century. Muhaqiq Hilli also believes in impurity of non-believers. Most of maraji (authorities such as Sayyid Ruhollah Khomeini, Nasir Makarim Shirazi, Sayyid Muhammad Rida Gulpaygani, and Sayyid Abu al-Qasim Khu’i) believed in impurity of Kuffar, including Ahle Al Kitab. Of course, Khu'i pointed out precaution ruling in the subject. However, there are some authorities such as Muhammad Baqir al-Sadr, Muhammad Fadil Lankarani, Sayyid ‘Ali al-Sistani, and Sayyid ‘Ali Khamene’i who did not believe in impurity of Ahle-Al-Kitab.

Some scholars such as Mulla Muhsin Fayd al-Kashani (d. 1680) and Al-Muhaqqiq al-Bahrani (d. 1708) did not believe in the impurity of non-believers, and particularly non-Kitabi. For instance, Kashani believes that the impurity of Kuffar is spiritual and internal, so there is no need to wash after touching them. This group believes in the purity of non-Muslims and of all humans. Muhammad Ibrahim Jannaati, Sayyid Muhammad Husayn Fadlullah, Seyed Mostafa Mohaghegh Damad and Yusuf Sani‘i are part of this group.

Sunni views
Sunni Islam has its own hygienical jurisprudence. It is preferable for a Sunni Muslim to remove the hair directly below the navel and under the arms also as trimming the nails once a week. Leaving hair and nails is permissible after 15 days and disliked after 40 days. The best day for removing needless hair and cutting nails is Friday. It is permissible to use shaving cream to remove needless hair. Needless hair and nails should be buried to prevent illnesses from spreading. Cutting eyebrows is permissible if they are too long. Sunni women should put their nails and hair removed from below the navel, and under the arms in a place where no non-permissible men can see it.

Personal grooming is also a matter of focus in Islam, and comprises all the ritual purity practices of prophets known as fitra. Allowing a beard to grow while trimming the moustache is emphasized with it being seen as mandatory by some respected Sunni scholars from the 4 major Sunni schools of jurisprudence.

Hygienical Jurisprudence
Islamic hygienical jurisprudence includes a number of regulations involving cleanliness during salat (obligatory prayer) through wudu (partial ablution) and ghusl (full ablution), as well as dietary laws and toilet etiquette for Muslims. The fiqh (Islamic jurisprudence) is based on admonitions in the Quran for Muslims to be ritually clean whenever possible, as well as in hadith literature (words, actions, or habits of the Islamic prophet Muhammad).

Cleanliness is an important part of Islam, including Quranic verses that teach how to achieve ritual cleanliness. Keeping oral hygiene through cleaning the teeth with the use of a form of toothbrush called miswak is considered sunnah, the way of Prophet Muhammad. Ritual ablution is also very important, as observed by the practices of wudu, ghusl, and tayammum (water-free alternative using any natural surface such as rock, sand, or dust).

In Muslim-majority countries, bathrooms are often equipped with a bidet. This ablution is required in order to maintain ritual cleanliness. The common Muslims practice of taking off shoes when entering mosques and homes is also based on ritual cleanliness.

Hygienical practices

Dietary laws

Islamic dietary laws provide a set of rules as to what Muslims eat in their diet. These rules specify the food that is halāl, meaning lawful. They are found in the Quran, usually detailing what is unlawful, or harām.

Genital hygiene
Removal of pubic hair and armpit hair is prescribed by the sunnah, and is listed among the ritual purity practices known as fitra.

Urine is forbidden to be on a Muslim during prayer times, as it is considered impure. The foreskin is a possible spot where urine and other impurities (smegma) can accumulate. Circumcision is used to prevent this.

Toilet etiquette

The Islamic faith has particular rules regarding personal hygiene when going to the toilet. This code is known as Qaḍāʾ al-Ḥājah.

Issues of laterality, such as whether one uses the left or right hand and the foot used to step into or out of toilet areas, are derived from hadith sources. The only issue which the Qur'an mentions is the one of washing one's hands especially after using the toilet which is mentioned in Quran 5:6.

Examples of these rules include, but are not limited to:

 It is strongly discouraged to relieve oneself into still water.
 It is preferable to step into the bathroom with the left foot and step outside the bathroom with the right foot.
 One should remain silent whilst on the toilet. Talking, answering greetings or greeting others is disliked.
 One should not face nor turn one's back on Qibla (the direction Muslims face to pray) whilst relieving oneself.
 When leaving the toilet one should say, "O Allah! Bestow your forgiveness upon me."
 Use of toilet paper is acceptable, but washing with water is still needed for purity and to minimize germs present in feces from touching the skin.

Sexual hygiene

Sexual hygiene in Islam is a prominent topic in Islamic jurisprudence (fiqh) due to its everyday nature.  explains:	
When there is discharge of thick, cloudy white fluid (wady) (that exits before or after urinating) or unlustful discharge of thin, sticky, white fluid (madhy) caused by play or kissing, it requires washing the private parts and wudu.	
Regarding things that necessitates ghusl:
sperm or female ejaculate that leaves its place of origin with desire [f: whether actual or effective], even if it exits the body without desire, even if without sexual intercourse;
the head of the penis entering either private part of a living human being who is fit for sexual intercourse, even without any release of sexual fluids…”
After partaking in sexual activity where penetration or ejaculation occurs, both men and women are required to complete a full-body ritual ablution known as ghusl in order to re-establish ritual purity before prayer. Ghusl requires clean, odorless water that has not been used for a previous ritual and begins with the declaration of the intention of purity and worship. A Muslim performing complete ablution then washes every part of his or her body.

See also

References

Further reading 
 QaraḍāwĪ, Yūsuf, and Waseem Yaqub. Islamic Concept of Hygiene as Seen by the Sunnah. Cairo, Egypt: El-Falah Foundation, 1997. .

External links 
 Laws of Islam concerning ritual purity
 Benefits Of Taharah And Its Importance In Islam
 noorani qaida

 
Islamic terminology
Islamic theology
Ismaili theology